Praskovya "Pasha" Nikitichna Angelina (– 21 January 1959) was a Soviet udarnik and Stakhanovite at the time of the first Five-Year-Plans. She was recognized as one of the first female tractor-operators in the USSR and was made a symbol of the technically educated female Soviet worker.

Biography
Angelina was born in Starobesheve, into a Greek family of peasants. Her father was a farmhand and her mother whitewashed huts. In 1929, she started attending tractor-driving courses in her native oblast while also working at a dairy farm. In 1933, she organized an all-female tractor team that was reported to have achieved 129% of the quota and thus to have ranked first among the tractor teams of the region. She was made a celebrity, placed prominently in the media and depicted on propaganda posters. In 1935, she was among the "Champions of Agricultural Labour" selected to hold a conference with the leaders of the Party and state in the Kremlin. At that conference, she officially promised to organize 10 more female tractor teams in her raion. In 1938 she signed an appeal entitled "One hundred thousand (female) friends - onto the tractor!" (Russian: "Сто тысяч подруг - на трактор!"). Women shouldering work with tractors made it possible for more men to be drafted into the Soviet Army before and during World War II. During the Second World War, Angelina studied agriculture in Moscow for two years and then worked as a team leader in Kazakhstan until the end of hostilities. After the war, she returned to work in the same function in Starobeshevo. In 1948, Angelina authored an autobiographical book, Lyudi kolkhoznykh polei ("The people of the kolkhoz fields").

Death
She died of cirrhosis in Moscow in 1959.

Awards

Angelina was twice a Hero of Socialist Labour (1947, 1958), a recipient of the Stalin Prize (1946), and was bestowed three Orders of Lenin and the Order of the Red Banner of Labour. She was also elected into the Supreme Soviet of the Soviet Union in 1937, 1946 and 1950.

Sources
 Great Soviet Encyclopedia, 2nd edition.
 Great Russian Encyclopedia

See also
 Naomi Parker Fraley
 Ronnie the Bren Gun Girl
 Rosie the Riveter

References

External links

here is a very extended poem in the Greek dialect of Ukraine (with translation into standard modern Greek) by Leontij Kyrjakov, which enthusiastically gives an account with many details of Pasha's life
Interview with Angelina's nephew (Russian)
Interview with Angelina's daughter (Russian)

1912 births
1959 deaths
People from Donetsk Oblast
People from Mariupolsky Uyezd
First convocation members of the Soviet of the Union
Second convocation members of the Supreme Soviet of the Soviet Union
Third convocation members of the Supreme Soviet of the Soviet Union
Fourth convocation members of the Supreme Soviet of the Soviet Union
Fifth convocation members of the Supreme Soviet of the Soviet Union
Heroes of Socialist Labour
Stalin Prize winners
Recipients of the Order of Lenin
Recipients of the Order of the Red Banner of Labour
Propaganda in the Soviet Union
Russian people of Greek descent
Soviet people of Greek descent
Deaths from cirrhosis